Agonopterix issikii is a moth in the family Depressariidae. It was described by Clarke in 1962. It is found in Japan.

The larvae feed on Orixa japonica.

References

Moths described in 1962
Agonopterix
Moths of Japan